University Hospital Bratislava – Academician Ladislav Dérer Hospital (until 30 June 2010 Faculty Hospital with Polyclinic Bratislava – Academician Ladislav Dérer Hospital – ; until 31 December 2004 Academician Ladislav Dérer Faculty Hospital with Polyclinic – ; colloquially Kramáre Hospital – , Nemocnica Kramáre or simply Kramáre) is a hospital in the New Town district of Bratislava, local part of Kramáre (Limbová 5). Its old building was built in 1968. It is named after Ladislav Dérer, a Slovak physician and professor (1897–1960). It is part of the University Hospital Bratislava.

Known patients 
 Jožo Ráž – in 1999 successfully underwent head surgery after a serious accident on a motorcycle
 Karol Ježík – 8 December 1998 was hospitalized unconscious after a head injury and subsequently died on 14 December 1998

Response in culture 
 "Sestrička z Kramárov" (song by Elán)

References

External links 
 Official website

Hospitals in Slovakia
Buildings and structures in Bratislava